Eliana Gropman (born February 5, 2001) is an American ice dancer. With her former skating partner, Ian Somerville, she is the 2019 U.S. national junior bronze medalist and the 2018 JGP Slovakia bronze medalist. They placed in the top twelve at the 2019 World Junior Championships.

Personal life 
Eliana Gropman was born February 5, 2001, in Washington, D.C. She graduated from Charles E. Smith Jewish Day School in Rockville, Maryland, in 2019 and currently attends the University of Michigan. Gropman is fluent in Hebrew and Spanish.

Career

Early career 
Gropman began skating at age 4 after attending a skating party. Gropman/Somerville announced their partnership in June 2008. They did not compete during the 2010–11 season after Somerville and his family moved to France for nine months. Together, they are the 2012 U.S. national juvenile and 2013 U.S. national intermediate champions, as well as the 2014 U.S. national novice silver medalists. They did not advance to the 2015 U.S. Championships, after placing fifth at 2015 Eastern Sectionals.

2015–2016 season 
Gropman/Somerville received their first ISU Junior Grand Prix assignment, placing tenth at 2015 JGP United States in Colorado Springs, Colorado. They won bronze at Midwestern Sectionals and finished seventh at the 2016 U.S. Championships. Gropman/Somerville then competed at the 2016 Bavarian Open, where they won silver behind Sofia Shevchenko / Igor Eremenko of Russia.

2016–2017 season 
Gropman/Somerville opened their season with the bronze medal at 2016 Lake Placid Ice Dance International behind U.S. teammates Rachel Parsons / Michael Parsons and Chloe Lewis / Logan Bye. They finished ninth at 2016 JGP France and fifth at 2016 NRW Trophy. Gropman/Somerville won bronze at Eastern Sectionals and finished sixth at the 2016 U.S. Championships.

2017–2018 season 
Gropman/Somerville began the season with a pair of fourth-place finishes at 2017 JGP Australia and 2017 JGP Croatia. They won silver at Eastern Sectionals and earned their first junior national medal, pewter, at the 2017 U.S. Championships.

2018–2019 season 
Gropman/Somerville won their first JGP medal, a bronze, at 2018 JGP Slovakia behind Russians Elizaveta Khudaiberdieva / Nikita Nazarov and Elizaveta Shanaeva / Devid Naryzhnyy. They placed fifth at 2018 JGP Canada. Gropman/Somerville won gold at Midwestern Sectionals and bronze at the 2019 U.S. Championships. With their result, they were named to the team for the 2019 World Junior Championships for the first time, alongside Caroline Green / Gordon Green and Avonley Nguyen / Vadym Kolesnik.

At 2019 Junior Worlds, Gropman/Somerville were ninth after the rhythm dance, but fell to twelfth overall following a thirteenth-place free dance. Somerville dissolved the partnership via email at the end of the season.

Programs

Competitive highlights 
JGP: Junior Grand Prix. Pewter medals (4th place) awarded only at U.S. national, sectional, and regional events.

References

External links 
 Eliana Gropman / Ian Somerville at the International Skating Union

2001 births
American female ice dancers
Living people
Figure skaters from Washington, D.C.
Michigan Wolverines athletes
21st-century American women